Bowlesville Township is one of ten townships in Gallatin County, Illinois, USA.  As of the 2010 census, its population was 188 and it contained 87 housing units.

Geography

Unincorporated towns
 Gibsonia at 
(This list is based on USGS data and may include former settlements.)

Extinct towns
 Bowlesville at 
(These towns are listed as "historical" by the USGS.)

Cemeteries
The township contains these three cemeteries: Earnshaw, Hogan and Stanley.

Major highways
  Illinois Route 1

Airports and landing strips
 Dortch Private Strip

Rivers
 Ohio River
 Saline River

Lakes
 Mud Lake

Demographics

School districts
 Gallatin Community Unit School District 7
 Hardin County Community Unit School District 1

Political districts
 Illinois' 19th congressional district
 State House District 118
 State Senate District 59

References
 
 United States Census Bureau 2007 TIGER/Line Shapefiles
 United States National Atlas

External links
 City-Data.com
 Illinois State Archives

Townships in Gallatin County, Illinois
Townships in Illinois